Frozza Orseolo (1015 – 17 February 1071) was a Margravine of Austria by marriage to Adalbert, Margrave of Austria.

Life
Frozza was born in Venice as a daughter of Otto Orseolo and his wife Grimelda of Hungary, Doge of Venice, and granddaughter of Pietro II Orseolo. Her brother was Peter, King of Hungary, and she was possibly a sister-in-law of Judith of Schweinfurt.

She married Adalbert, Margrave of Austria and later took the name of Adelheid and bore a son Ernest, Margrave of Austria.

References

1015 births
1071 deaths
11th-century Italian nobility
Austrian royal consorts
11th-century Venetian women
Frozza